Fall Back Open is the second album by Athens-based indie rock band Now It's Overhead. It was released March 9, 2004, on Saddle Creek Records.

Track listing
"Wait in a Line" – 3:40
"Surrender" – 3:37
"Profile" – 4:27
"Turn & Go" – 3:25
"Fall Back Open" – 4:29
"The Decision Made Itself" – 3:40
"Reverse" – 5:22
"Antidote" – 5:26
"A Little Consolation" – 6:47

References

2004 albums
Now It's Overhead albums
Saddle Creek Records albums
Albums produced by Andy LeMaster